D block, Block D, or variants, may refer to:

 d-block, a division of the periodic table of elements
 D-Block Records, a hip-hop record label
 D-Block at Alcatraz Federal Penitentiary
 Block D, a Soviet rocket stage
 Block D, a portion of the United States 2008 wireless spectrum auction that was not sold during the auction